Stranger (stylized in all capitals) is an extended play (EP) marketed as the fourth single of Japanese boy group JO1. Consisting of a total of six songs that fall mostly in the EDM, futurepop and city pop genres, the EP single was released by Lapone Entertainment into three different physical editions and one digital edition on August 18, 2021.

As part of the promotion, the two B-side tracks were released as a digital single prior to the release of the EP single. "Dreaming Night", used as the opening song of drama , was released on June 25, while "Freedom" was released on July 7 for Yves Saint Laurent Beauté's fragrance web commercial video. Both tracks managed to chart in Billboard Japan Hot 100. Stranger became the fourth single of the group that earned number one position on the Oricon Singles Chart and became their fastest single that surpassed 400,000 copies sold according to Billboard Japan. It earned a Platinum certification from the Recording Industry Association of Japan. Meanwhile, the lead track "Real" peaked atop the Billboard Japan Hot 100, and its music video was named as the Best Dance Video by the 2021 MTV Video Music Awards Japan.

Background and release 
On June 8, 2021, JO1 featured for the third time as the headliner for Tokyo Girls Collection. In the 2021 Sanrio Character Awards' result presentation part of the event, the group performed  two songs, "Shine a Light" and "Yancha Girl Yancha Boy", from their first studio album The Star (2020). For the latter, they performed together with character Cinnamoroll. At the end of the performance, leader Sho Yonashiro announced the group would release their fourth EP single Stranger on August 18. Continuing the theme of their previous single Challenger where they were "stepping into the unknown world", the concept for this single was said to be "encountering the world and discovering a new self". The covers for the EP singles were released on June 21. A commemorative live streaming was then held on the single's release day where JO1 announced that their first live concert titled 2021 JO1 Live "Open the Door" would be held on November 19–21, 2021, at Makuhari Messe, Chiba city.

Stranger consists of a total of six songs that were released into three different physical editions with "Real" served as the lead track. Each type of the single consists of four tracks with three common tracks, which are "Real", "Icarus" and "Blooming Again". The special track of the limited edition A and B, "Freedom" and "Dreaming Night", were released as a digital single on July 7 and June 25, respectively, while "Icarus" was pre-released on August 11 alongside its performance video. The limited edition A comes with a DVD bundle consisting of a variety segment with the members called Beautiful Stranger. The limited edition B and the normal edition come with a photo booklet and a CD-only, respectively. A special edition EP that includes all the songs was released for digital download and streaming.

Lead track 
The lead track "Real" is an EDM song in a genre called futurepop. Jung Ho-hyun (e.one), who was in charge of lyrics, composing, and arrangement, has worked with groups such as Wanna One and Exo. The lyrics was said to express the growth and change of JO1. Choreographed by Yoo Seung-hyun, the move where the members hugging each other symbolizes JO1 members meeting their "new" selves they have never met.

The song was pre-released on July 30, 2021, alongside the music video. It was used as the theme song for the 18th edition of Fuji TV's annual summer event The Odaiba held on August 14–September 5, 2021, and later peaked at number one on the Billboard Japan Hot 100. The music video gained more than one million views on YouTube in its first 24 hours, helping the group to reach their highest views in a week on the Oricon YouTube chart. It was then crowned as the Best Dance Video by the 2021 MTV Video Music Awards Japan.

Promotion 
The promotion for Stranger started with the first performance of B-side track "Dreaming Night", which had been used as the opening song of MBS's drama , at the KCON:TACT 4U on June 25, 2021. The group also performed the song on their namesake TV show Toresugi JO1 2 on July 16. The song peaked at number 85 on Billboard Japan Hot 100 in its second week. JO1 then performed another B-side track "Freedom" on July 7 at the launching of Yves Saint Laurent Beauté's fragrance web commercial video which featured the song, and released a special performance video on the group's official YouTube channel on the same day. The song debuted at number 82 on Billboard Japan Hot 100 in the release week.

To further promote the single, JO1 was appointed as "artist of the month" for Tokyo FM's nationwide weekly program Monthly Artist File: The Voice for the month of August 2021. They also released a performance video for the track "Icarus", which acts as the "answer song" to the song "Monstar" from The Star. Both performance video of "Icarus" and "Freedom" are directed by Hidejin Kato. JO1 also released a self-produced music video for "Stay".

On August 13, JO1 performed "Real" for the first time on Mezamashi 8. It served as a teaser for their live performance at The Odaiba on the following day, where they performed three other songs from the single and their previous lead track "Born to Be Wild". They also performed "Real" on music show CDTV Live Live and their namesake show Playlist JO1. On September 23, JO1 participated in a joint live concert along with other post-Produce 101 Japan groups, OWV and Enjin, titled KCON World Premiere: The Triangle. They performed all songs from Stranger between the two shows.

Commercial performance 
Stranger debuted at number one on the Oricon Daily Singles Chart and eventually topped the weekly chart with over 280,000 copies sold, keeping the streak the group has since their debut single Protostar. This streak earned JO1 an achievement as the tenth overall group and the fifth male group in the history of Oricon charts to have first week sales of over 200,000 copies for four consecutive singles since its debut. JO1 saw an increase in sales with Stranger surpassing the total sales of the last two singles in its second week on the Oricon Charts. It was certified Platinum by the Recording Industry Association of Japan for shipments of over 250,000 physical units. By the end of 2021, the single ranked twenty-first on the 2021 Oricon Annual Ranking with 366,212 copies sold.

On Billboard Japan, Stranger debuted atop Top Singles Sales chart, and became JO1's fastest single that surpassed 400,000 copies sold (in two weeks). It eventually became twenty-first best selling single on the annual chart.

Track listing 
"Real", "Icarus" and "Blooming Again" are common track 1, 3 and 4, respectively, for limited edition A, limited edition B and normal edition.

Charts

Weekly charts

Monthly charts

Year-end charts

Certifications

Release history

References 

JO1 songs
2021 songs
2021 singles
Billboard Japan Hot 100 number-one singles
Japanese-language songs
Oricon Weekly number-one singles